"" is the 34th single by Zard, released May 22, 2002 under the B-Gram Records label. After one and half year, new and only single was released in 2002. Many fans called this time Zard Chapter 2 Start by maturing and changing the style of songs. The single debuted at #4 rank first week. It charted for 5 weeks and sold over 69,000 copies.

Track list
All songs are written by Izumi Sakai, composed and arranged by Akihito Tokunaga

Akihito Tokunaga and Tomoyo Yoshida were participating in chorus part

Akihito Tokunaga was participating in chorus part
Seven Rainbow
Akihito Tokunaga and Michael Africk were participating in chorus part
 (original karaoke)

References

2002 singles
Zard songs
Songs written by Izumi Sakai
Songs with music by Akihito Tokunaga
2002 songs